Chani is a fictional character featured in Frank Herbert's novels Dune (1965) and Dune Messiah (1969). Known mainly as the Fremen wife and legal concubine of protagonist Paul Atreides, Chani is the daughter of Imperial Planetologist Liet-Kynes and his Fremen wife Faroula, and later the mother of the twins Ghanima and Leto II Atreides. The character is later resurrected as a ghola, appearing in Hunters of Dune (2006) and Sandworms of Dune (2007), Brian Herbert and Kevin J. Anderson's novels which complete the original series.

Chani is portrayed by actress Sean Young in the David Lynch film Dune (1984), by Barbora Kodetová in the John Harrison miniseries Frank Herbert's Dune (2000) and the sequel Frank Herbert's Children of Dune (2003), and by Zendaya in the 2021 Denis Villeneuve film Dune.

Character overview

Dune
In Dune, Paul's prescience begins manifesting itself through dreams while he is still living in his ancestral home on the planet Caladan; he sees Chani in these visions, though they have not yet met. Paul and the Atreides come to the desert planet Arrakis, but Paul's father Duke Leto is soon killed by the Harkonnens and Paul and his mother Lady Jessica are forced to flee into the desert. They are reluctantly taken in by a tribe of the planet's native Fremen, and Chani is the Fremen woman put in charge of protecting and guiding Paul. They soon become lovers, and Paul rises as a religious leader among the Fremen, and is called Muad'Dib.

Already a talented warrior before meeting Paul, Chani becomes deadly after training by Paul and Jessica in the Bene Gesserit martial arts called the "weirding way" by the Fremen. Chani later manages to bring Paul out of the deep spice trance he falls into after using spice essence to enhance his powers. Paul and Chani's first child, Leto II (not to be confused with their later son, Leto II Atreides), is killed as an infant in a Corrino raid on their home in the deep desert.

To cement his control of the Empire after deposing Padishah Emperor Shaddam IV, Paul takes Shaddam's daughter, the Princess Irulan as his wife. Chani understands the political reasons, but Paul reassures her:
"I swear to you now ... that you'll need no title. That woman over there will be my wife and you but a concubine because this is a political thing and we must weld peace out of this moment, enlist the Great Houses of the Landsraad. We must obey the forms. Yet that princess shall have no more of me than my name. No child of mine nor touch nor softness of glance, nor instant of desire."

Jessica adds:
"Think on it, Chani: that princess will have the name, yet she'll live as less than a concubine—never to know a moment of tenderness from the man to whom she's bound. While we, Chani, we who carry the name of concubine—history will call us wives."

Dune Messiah
Twelve years later in Dune Messiah, Paul remains completely loyal to Chani. With their breeding program in mind, the Bene Gesserit are desperate to regain control of Paul's bloodline, and are fearful of the effect Chani's "wild" genes may have on their offspring. Wishing to rid himself of their machinations, Paul negotiates with the Bene Gesserit Reverend Mother Gaius Helen Mohiam: "You may have my seed, but not my person ... Irulan banished and inseminated ... You may have my seed for your plans, but no child of Irulan's will sit on my throne." Of course, artificial insemination is prohibited in the wake of the Butlerian Jihad, and the idea of it is as horrific to the Sisterhood as the loss of the "precious Atreides genes".

Irulan, herself Bene Gesserit-trained, secretly feeds Chani contraceptives to prevent her from conceiving an Imperial heir. However, Chani eventually changes to an ancient Fremen diet to enhance fertility; Irulan is unable to interfere, and Chani soon becomes pregnant. Tragically, Chani dies giving birth to the twins Ghanima and Leto II. His intricate plan coming to fruition, the Tleilaxu agent Scytale offers to "resurrect" Chani as a ghola in return for Tleilaxu control of the empire, but Paul has him killed. Through his prescience, Paul can see that Chani's death during childbirth is far less painful and cruel than her possible future fates had she survived.

Children of Dune
Despite her death, Chani lives on as part of the Other Memory of her pre-born twins. In Children of Dune, this ancestral self is summoned by Ghanima for her guidance, but Chani's persona nearly possesses Ghanima completely. Leto II manages to save his sister from this Abomination by summoning Paul through his own Other Memory; Paul threatens Chani, who releases her hold on Ghanima. At the end of the novel, Chani's memory-self becomes a guardian against Ghanima's other ancestral memories who may try to possess her, allowing her daughter's personality to continue and grow in safety.

God Emperor of Dune
According to God Emperor of Dune, a version of Chani's memory-self also exists in Leto II. By the time of the novel, Leto is able to allow his ancestral memories to speak through his mouth without threat of Abomination. At one point, he allows Chani to speak through him.

Hunters of Dune and Sandworms of Dune
In the 2006 Brian Herbert/Kevin J. Anderson sequel Hunters of Dune, gholas of Paul and Chani are among the others created to assist mankind in the climactic battle with what turns out to be the thinking machines.

In Sandworms of Dune (2007), Paul ultimately duels another Paul Atreides ghola — named Paolo — created by the Face Dancers and twisted by the sadistic ghola of Baron Harkonnen himself. Paul is mortally wounded, but the trauma restores his memories and he manages to heal himself. Later, on the recovering planet Dune, the awakened gholas of Paul and Chani go about restoring the planet to its former glory. They have reverted to the ways of the ancient Fremen, resolving to lead simple lives and unafraid of the plots and schemes that had threatened them in their previous lives. Now able to devote all of his attention to her, Chani remarks that Paul has finally learned how to treat his wife. As the novel closes, Paul reaffirms his love for Chani, telling her he has loved her for five thousand years.

In adaptations
Chani is portrayed by actress Sean Young in the David Lynch film Dune (1984), and by Barbora Kodetová in the John Harrison miniseries Frank Herbert's Dune (2000) and its sequel Frank Herbert's Children of Dune (2003). Zendaya portrays Chani in the 2021 Denis Villeneuve film Dune. This is a minor role that only required four days of filming. Zendaya's portrayal of Chani, along with Timothée Chalamet's Paul were added to Fortnite Battle Royale in October 2021.

Emmet Asher-Perrin of Tor.com wrote that "Kodetová is divine as Chani in both her sensitivity and fierceness".

Family tree

References

Dune (franchise) characters
Literary characters introduced in 1965
Female characters in literature